Factor X, also known as Stuart-Prower factor or as thrombokinase, is an enzyme.

Factor X may also refer to:
 Factor X (Ailyn album), a 2007 album by Ailyn
 Factor X (Chile), the Chilean version of The X Factor
 Factor X (Portuguese TV series), the Portuguese version of The X Factor
 Factor X (Spain), the Spanish version of The X Factor
 El Factor X, the Colombian version of The X Factor
  Factor X, a reference to protoporphyrin IX or haemin when used to identify Haemophilus influenzae in a microbiology laboratory

See also
 X Factor (disambiguation)